The Ven.  Richard Wickham Legg  (23 July 1867 – 18 January 1952) was the Archdeacon of Berkshire  from 1922 until 1942.

Legg was the son of William Legg, sometime Rector of Hawkinge and educated at Harrow, New College, Oxford and Ripon College Cuddesdon. He began his ordained ministry as a curate at Aylesbury, after which he was a lecturer and  chaplain at his old theological college. He was the vicar of St John's, Newbury, Berkshire from 1900 to 1912 when he became the vicar of St Mary's, Reading.

References

1877 births
People educated at Harrow School
Alumni of New College, Oxford
Alumni of Ripon College Cuddesdon
Archdeacons of Berkshire
1952 deaths
People from Newbury, Berkshire